Podpeshinsky is a rural locality (a khutor) in Kletsko-Pochtovskoye Rural Settlement, Serafimovichsky District, Volgograd Oblast, Russia. The population was 27 as of 2010. There is 1 street.

Geography 
Podpeshinsky is located 12 km south of Serafimovich (the district's administrative centre) by road. 2-y Bobrovsky is the nearest rural locality.

References 

Rural localities in Serafimovichsky District